The Dean and Chapter of Ripon Cathedral are the ecclesiastical governing body of Ripon Cathedral. They consist of the dean and several canons meeting in chapter and are also (less frequently) known as the Dean and Canons of Ripon.

Ripon Cathedral was a collegiate church until 1547 when it was dissolved. Collegiate status was restored on 2 August 1604 when King James I of England issued a Charter of Restoration.  The Charter made Ripon a collegiate church with a Dean and 6 canons.

In 1836 the new bishopric of Ripon was founded, and the number of prebendaries reduced, after the vacation of two of the stalls, to four residentiary canons.

Dean of Ripon
See Dean of Ripon.

1st Prebend

2nd Prebend

3rd Prebend

4th Prebend

5th Prebend

6th Prebend

References

History of the Church of England
Anglican ecclesiastical offices
Yorkshire-related lists
Ripon